One Thousand Roads to Mecca: Ten Centuries of Travelers Writing about the Muslim Pilgrimage is a collection of travel journals edited by Michael Wolfe and published in 1999. Covering over 20 accounts made over 10 centuries, this work shows many sides of the Hajj, the Pilgrimage to Mecca required of every able Muslim.

Included are accounts of Naser-e Khosraw, Ibn Jubayr, Ibn Battuta and ultimately the pilgrimage of Michael Wolfe himself.

Contributors 
Naser-e Khosraw, Persia, 1050
Ibn Jubayr, Spain, 1183-84
Ibn Battuta, Morocco, 1326
Ludovico di Varthema, Bologna, 1503
A Pilgrim with No Name, Italy, 1575
Joseph Pitts, England, 1685
Ali Bey al-Abbasi, Spain, 1807
John Lewis Burckhardt, Switzerland, 1814
Sir Richard Burton, Great Britain, 1953
Her Highness Sikandar, the Begum of Bhopal, India, 1864
John F. Keane, Anglo-India, 1877-78
Mohammad Hosayn Farahani, Persia, 1885-86
Arthur J. B. Wavell, Anglo-Africa, 1908
Eldon Rutter, Great Britain, 1925
Winifred Stegar, Australia, 1927
Muhammad Asad, Galicia, 1927
Harry St. John Philby, Great Britain, 1931
Lady Evelyn Cobbold, Great Britain, 1933
Hamza Bogary, Mecca, 1947
Jalal Al-e Ahmad, Iran, 1964
Malcolm X, United States, 1964
Saida Miller Khalifa, Great Britain, 1970
Michael Wolfe, United States, 1990

References 

 

1999 non-fiction books
Non-Islamic Islam studies literature
Hajj accounts
American travel books